Mustaʾmīn or Musta'man is a historical Islamic term for a non-Muslim foreigner temporarily residing in Muslim lands with and aman or guarantee of short-term safe-conduct (aman mu'aqqat) affording the protected status of dhimmis (non-Muslim subjects permanently living in a Muslim-ruled land) without the payment of jizya.

Merchants, messengers, students and other groups could be given an aman, while foreign envoys and emissaries were automatically protected.

Types of safe-conducts
The short-term safe-conduct can be personal or general:
 Personal aman (khass) can be granted by any sane and mature Muslim to one or a group of non-Muslim foreigners (harbis).
 General aman ('amm) can be granted only by the caliph or his deputy to an unspecified number of harbis.

The term is valid up to one year for the musta'min, along with his minor children and all the women related to him. Many Hanbalite jurists allowed the period of aman to one lunar year. Others argued for an indefinite aman.

Legal rights
Once given amaan, the musta'mins are free to engage in trade and travel.  They are allowed to bring their family and children.  They have permission to visit any city in Muslim territory except the holy cities of Mecca and Medina.  A musta'min man is allowed to marry a dhimmi woman and take her back to his homeland; however, musta'min women do not have the same right.  The musta'min are subject to civil and criminal law in the territory and may not do or say anything that could be construed as harming the interests of Islam.  If caught doing so, the musta'min could be expelled or executed and the amaan grantor could also be penalized.

See also
 Dhimmi
 Dhimmitude
 Jizya

References

Sources
 

 

Islamic terminology
Islam and other religions
Medieval international relations
Law of war